The Stabroek News is a privately owned newspaper published in Guyana. It takes its name from Stabroek , the former name of Georgetown, Guyana.

It was first published in November 1986, first as a weekly but it later changed to a daily print newspaper. The entry of the paper into the mass media in Guyana brought a new openness to the media environment in the country. 

It was founded by David DeCaires, who died on November 1, 2008.

Stabroek News is also the sole distributor of DirecTV Caribbean in Guyana. 

There has been some controversy as illegal distributors of DirecTV Caribbean in Guyana have not provided services to those who have paid for it.

References

External links 
 Stabroek News website

Newspapers published in Guyana
1986 establishments in Guyana
English-language newspapers published in South America
Publications established in 1986